Calmont is a commune in the Haute-Garonne department in southwestern France.

Population

Sights
The ruins of the 14th century castle (the Château de Calmont) are a historic site listed by the French Ministry of Culture.

See also
Communes of the Haute-Garonne department

References

Communes of Haute-Garonne
Haute-Garonne communes articles needing translation from French Wikipedia